Wenxi may refer to the following places in China:

Wenxi County, Yuncheng, Shanxi
Wenxi, Zhejiang, town and subdivision of Qingtian County, Zhejiang
 Wenxi Township, Hunan, township and subdivision of Jingzhou Miao and Dong Autonomous County, Hunan
 Wenxi Township, Sichuan (闻溪乡), township in Jiange County, Sichuan

See also
Wenxi Fire, 1938 fire in Changsha, Hunan